The 72nd edition of the KNVB Cup started on September 2, 1989. The final was played on April 25, 1990: PSV beat Vitesse Arnhem 1–0 and won the cup for the sixth time.

Teams
 All 18 participants of the Eredivisie 1988-89, eight of which entering in the second round
 All 19 participants of the Eerste Divisie 1988-89
 27 teams from lower (amateur) leagues

First round
The matches of the first round were played on September 2 and 3, 1989.

E Eredivisie; 1 Eerste Divisie; A Amateur teams

Intermediary Round
There was only room for 32 teams in the next round, so this intermediary round was held on October 4, 1989.

Second round
The matches of the second round were played on December 8, 9, 10 and 13 1989. The ten highest ranked Eredivisie teams from last season entered the tournament this round.

E ten Eredivisie entrants

Round of 16
The matches of the round of 16 were played on January 13 and 14, 1990.

Quarter finals
The quarter finals were played on February 14, 1990.

Semi-finals
The semi-finals were played on March 14, 1990.

Final

PSV would participate in the Cup Winners' Cup.

See also
Eredivisie 1989-90
Eerste Divisie 1989-90

References

External links
 Netherlands Cup Full Results 1970–1994 by the RSSSF

1989-90
1989–90 domestic association football cups
1989–90 in Dutch football